Perdiguero is a Pyrenean summit, culminating at , located on the French-Spanish border.

Topography 
Located between the Spanish municipality of Benasque and the commune of Oô, near Bagnères-de-Luchon in the Comminges between the department of Haute-Garonne and the province of Aragon, Perdiguero is the highest summit of Haute-Garonne before la pointe de Literole.

Lake Portillon lies at its foot.

References 

Mountains of the Pyrenees
Landforms of Haute-Garonne
Mountains of Aragon
Pyrenean three-thousanders